Jupiter LXVIII, provisionally known as S/2017 J 7, is an outer natural satellite of Jupiter. It was discovered by Scott S. Sheppard and his team in 2017, but not announced until July 17, 2018, via a Minor Planet Electronic Circular from the Minor Planet Center. It is about 2 kilometers in diameter and orbits at a semi-major axis of about 20,627,000 km  with an inclination of about 143.4°. It belongs to the Ananke group.

References

Ananke group
Moons of Jupiter
Irregular satellites
Discoveries by Scott S. Sheppard
Astronomical objects discovered in 2017
Moons with a retrograde orbit